Hattan Sultan Ahmed Bahebri (born 16 July 1992) is a Saudi Arabian footballer. He plays as a winger and attacking midfielder for Al-Shabab. In May 2018, he was named to the Saudi Arabia's preliminary squad for the 2018 FIFA World Cup in Russia.

Club career
Hattan progressed through the youth ranks of Al-Ittihad. He was first called up to the first team during the Quarter-final match against FC Seoul in 2011 AFC Champions League. He made his first team debut during the 2011–12 season against Al-Taawoun. He spent four seasons with the club and made 37 appearances with club scoring 0 goals and assisting 4 goals.

On 1 July 2014, Bahebri joined fellow Pro League side Al-Khaleej on loan for the 2014–15 season. On 10 July 2015, the loan was renewed for a further season. He ended his time with Al-Khaleej making 46 appearances and scoring 6 goals.

On 1 August 2016, Bahebri signed a 3-year contract with Al-Shabab. He ended his first season with the club making 18 appearances and scoring twice. Bahebri excelled in his second season with the club, earning him a call-up to the national team for the 23rd Arabian Gulf Cup. He made his first cap in nearly 6 years during the opening match against Kuwait. He spent two and a half seasons with the club making 53 appearances and scoring 8 goals in all competitions. During this time, Bahebri represented the national team in 3 tournaments, the 23rd Arabian Gulf Cup, the 2018 FIFA World Cup and the 2019 AFC Asian Cup.

On 1 February 2019, Bahebri joined city rivals and Pro League champions Al-Hilal on a three-year contract.

On 31 August 2021, Bahebri rejoined Al-Shabab.

Career statistics

Club

International
Statistics accurate as of match played 30 November 2022.

International goals
Scores and results list Saudi Arabia's goal tally first.

Honors
Al-Ittihad
 King Cup: 2013

Al-Hilal
 Saudi Professional League: 2019–20, 2020–21
 King Cup: 2019–20
 AFC Champions League: 2019

References

1992 births
Living people
Ittihad FC players
Khaleej FC players
Al-Shabab FC (Riyadh) players
Al Hilal SFC players
Sportspeople from Jeddah
Saudi Arabian footballers
Saudi Professional League players
Association football wingers
2018 FIFA World Cup players
2019 AFC Asian Cup players
Saudi Arabia international footballers
Saudi Arabia youth international footballers
2022 FIFA World Cup players